Jonathan Young, Jonathon Young, or Johnathan Young may refer to:

Johnathan Young (born 1959), British television producer
Jonathan Young (commodore) (1826–1885), United States Navy commodore
Jonathan Young (politician) (born 1958), member of the New Zealand House of Representatives
Jonathan Young (psychologist), American psychologist and mythographer
Jonathon Young (born 1973), Canadian actor

See also
John Young (disambiguation)
Johnny Young (disambiguation)